Kota Kinabalu Wetland Centre is  of the only remains of mangrove forest that once existed extensively along the coastal region of Kota Kinabalu, Malaysia. Previously known as Likas Swamp or Likas Mangrove and later Kota Kinabalu City Bird Sanctuary, the Centre came foremost out of 20 wetlands selected by the Sabah Wetlands Inventory Committee in 1986.

The Centre is an important refuge and feeding ground for many species of resident birds, as well as several migratory bird species from Northern Asia.  In addition, it is a breeding ground for marine life protected by the Fishery Department of Sabah.

Apart from providing shelter and food for both resident and migratory species of wildlife, wetlands also prevent salt build-up in surrounding freshwater supplies, stabilising sedimentation, storing nutrients and removing toxins.

Wildlife
Birds from around the globe, including non-breeding winter visitors, are commonly sighted at the sanctuary, especially during migratory season of Asian birds (i.e. Sept-April).

Common visitors
Little egret, a winter visitor to Borneo;
Striated heron, a winter visitor from the mainland of Asia;
White-winged tern, a common migrant and winter visitor throughout Greater Sunda Islands
Black-crowned night-heron, a non-breeding visitor to Sumatra and North Borneo;
White-breasted waterhen, a common resident;
Marsh sandpiper, a winter visitor from Siberia and China;
Common moorhen, a common breeding bird in marshy environments and well-vegetated lakes outside Antarctica and Australasia;
Cinnamon bittern, a breeding bird in tropical Asia, some northern birds migrate in short distances;
Common redshank, a widespread breeding bird across Europe and northern Asia;

Rare sightings
Lesser adjutant stork, a resident breeder in Southern Asia;
Nankeen night heron

Year-round residents
Crested myna
Yellow-vented bulbul
Yellow-bellied prinia
Magpie robin
Pacific swallow
Spotted dove
Collared kingfisher
Purple heron
Green pigeons

Other mangrove wildlife includes monitor lizards, fiddler crabs, mudskippers, weaver ants, butterflies and other insects, jellyfish, water snakes and mud lobsters.

References

External links
 Official website
 Kota Kinabalu Wetland - Ramsar

Kota Kinabalu
Bird sanctuaries
Nature conservation in Malaysia
Wetlands of Malaysia
Protected areas of Sabah
Nature centers
Ramsar sites in Malaysia